Perks is an unincorporated community in Pulaski County, Illinois, United States. Perks has a post office with ZIP code 62973. Perks was originally known as Stringtown. 

The community has one grocery store and gas station. Local attractions include the Cache River State Natural Area. Perks has fewer than 100 people, many of whom are farmers or longtime residents of the community.

References

Unincorporated communities in Pulaski County, Illinois
Unincorporated communities in Illinois